

Computing
EFAIL, a security hole in encrypted email delivery systems

Geography
Efail Fach
Efail Isaf
Cae Llety-yr-efail